The  is a light rail line in Tokyo, Japan, operated by Tokyu Corporation.

Overview 
Since the railway merged with Tokyu in 1938, the balance of the line closed in 1969, leaving this isolated section as the sole Tokyu line to use  gauge.

The Setagaya Line and the Toden Arakawa Line (the only surviving line of the former Tokyo Toden network) are the only railway lines in Tokyo proper to be legally classified as tramways (軌道, kidō).

The line has its own smart card system called Setamaru, which cannot be used on other Tokyu lines. Since March 2007 the PASMO contactless card has also been accepted on the Setagaya and other Tokyu lines.

Stations
All stations are located in Setagaya.

Miyanosaka Station was formerly known as Gotokujimae (豪徳寺前駅).

Matsubara was formerly known as Rokushojinjamae (六所神社前駅) and was moved approximately 100 meters to the north.

An eleventh station known as Shichikenchō (七軒町駅) was located between the present Matsubara and Shimo-takaido stations.

References

External links

 Tokyu Corporation website 

Setagaya Line
Tram transport in Japan
Railway lines in Tokyo
4 ft 6 in gauge railways in Japan
600 V DC railway electrification